Ulrich Beyers is a South African rugby union player who plays for the Vladivostok Tigers in Russia. He signed for the club in August 2020. His regular position is centre or full-back.

Blue Bulls

He played for Pretoria-based side  between 2011 and 2014, making 34 appearances in the Currie Cup and Vodacom Cup competitions. He also made 10 appearances for the  Super Rugby side.

At the start of 2015, he joined French Top 14 side  as a medical joker,

Rugby Zebre

He joined Italian Pro12 side Zebre for the 2015–16 Pro12 season. He played 15 games, starting 8, playing 783 minutes, contributing 12 points in the 2015-2016 PRO12 series.  He played 110 minutes in 3 games the European Rugby Cup contributing 3 points.  He scored his first try and conversion in the Pro14 for Zebre against Cardiff Blues.

Blue Bulls

Southern Kings

He joined the  ahead of the 2018–19 Pro14.

References

Living people
1991 births
South African rugby union players
Blue Bulls players
Bulls (rugby union) players
Rugby union players from Pretoria
Rugby union fullbacks
Rugby union centres
South Africa Under-20 international rugby union players
Southern Kings players
Union Bordeaux Bègles players
Zebre Parma players
Eastern Province Elephants players